Lake of Egypt is a reservoir in the Little Egypt region of the U.S. state of Illinois. The lake is owned by the Southern Illinois Power Cooperative (SIPC), who created the impoundment in 1962, by damming the South fork of the Saline River, to supply cooling water for a coal-burning electric power plant.

As a privately owned lake, it is subject to regulation by its owners and the state. Terms of use from the SIPC are in the "Official Lake of Egypt Rules and Regulations". Public access is allowed as are all size boat motors. Waterskiing and jet skis are also permitted in most of the lake. Fishing includes Bluegill, Largemouth Bass, Channel Catfish, Striped Bass, and Crappie. Camping at the lake is allowed at Buck Ridge Campground, part of the Shawnee National Forest.  Each neighborhood on the lake has individual subdivisions (list of Lake of Egypt subdivisions) as well as the non-for-profit Lake of Egypt Association of Property Owners (LEAPO)

History
Lake of Egypt was founded by Southern Illinois Power Cooperative (SIPC) to supply cooling water to their newly constructed coal burning power plant.  The lake was created in 1962 by damming the south fork of the Saline River. The name was chosen from the nickname "Little Egypt" of Southern Illinois.

Tourism and Recreation
There are currently three marinas serving Lake of Egypt:

 The Resort at Egyptian Hills
 Mack's Lake of Egypt Marina
 Pyramid Acres

References

External links
 Lake of Egypt Association of Property Owners

Egypt
Protected areas of Williamson County, Illinois
Protected areas of Johnson County, Illinois
Bodies of water of Williamson County, Illinois
Bodies of water of Johnson County, Illinois
1962 establishments in Illinois
Cooling ponds